Gamo may refer to:

 Gamo (airgun manufacturer), a Spanish airgun manufacturer
 Gamō clan (蒲生氏, Gamō-shi), a Japanese clan which claimed descent from the Fujiwara clan
 Gamo people, an Ethiopian ethnic group
 Gamō, Shiga (蒲生町, Gamō-chō), a former town located in Gamō District, Shiga, Japan
 Gamō Station (蒲生駅, Gamō-eki), a station on the Tōbu Railway located in Koshigaya, Saitama, Japan
 Gamō (surname)
 Gamō-yonchōme Station (蒲生四丁目駅, Gamō-Yonchōme-eki), a train station on the Osaka Municipal Subway Imazatosuji Line and Nagahori Tsurumi-ryokuchi Line
 Spanish frigate El Gamo, an 1801 32-gun Spanish Navy frigate
 Gamo or Gamou, a Serer religious festival